Bokermannohyla clepsydra is a species of frogs in the family Hylidae.

It is endemic to Serra da Bocaina National Park and Rio de Janeiro, Brazil.
Its natural habitats are subtropical or tropical moist lowland forests and rivers. It is known only from a few specimens so it is not well known.

Sources

 

Bokermannohyla
Endemic fauna of Brazil
Amphibians described in 1925
Taxonomy articles created by Polbot
Taxobox binomials not recognized by IUCN